Storm is a 2009 German-Danish-Dutch drama film directed by Hans-Christian Schmid.

Plot 
Storm follows the developments of a trial at the Hague for war crimes committed during the Bosnian War. Prosecutor Hannah Maynard (Kerry Fox), charges a Bosnian Serb Commander for killing Bosniaks. However, her main witness is found to be lying and later commits suicide. Hannah retraces his steps to try and get to the truth.

Cast 
 Kerry Fox - Hannah Maynard
 Anamaria Marinca - Mira Arendt
 Stephen Dillane - Keith Haywood
 Rolf Lassgård - Jonas Dahlberg
 Alexander Fehling - Patrick Färber
 Tarik Filipović - Mladen Banović
 Krešimir Mikić - Alen Hajdarević
  - Jan Arendt
 Jadranka Đokić - Belma Šulić
 Dražen Kühn - Goran Durić

Reception 
Writing for the New York Times, Stephen Holden called Storm "remarkably restrained" and "very well acted."

References

External links 

2009 drama films
2009 films
English-language German films
English-language Dutch films
English-language Danish films
German drama films
Dutch drama films
Danish drama films
Films about war crimes trials
2000s German films
Films directed by Hans-Christian Schmid